Samuel Khachikian (October 21, 1923 – October 22, 2001) was an Iranian film director, screenwriter, author, and film editor of Armenian descent. He was one of the most influential figures of Iranian cinema and was nicknamed "Iran's Hitchcock".

Biography 
Born 1923 in Tabriz to a family of Armenian immigrants. Khachikian's father escaped the Armenian genocide in 1915 and settled in Tabriz. His mother admired cinema and the arts and often took her children to the theater. Samuel Khachikian published his first poem "The Prison" in the Armenian newspaper Alik when he was nine. Five years later, he gave his first stage performance in Tabriz in a play titled "Seville". He completed his education in History and Journalism, and wrote eight plays which went on stage not only in different cities of Iran, but also in Los Angeles, San Francisco and Greece.

Khachikian made his first film in 1953, titled Return. He was among the first and few directors who used the decoupage technique on the film set, preparing the complete shooting script in advance. The success of his works attracted a lot of attention to the advantages of this filmmaking approach. As an innovative filmmaker, he turned the production of murder mysteries and noir thrillers into a popular new wave in the Iranian filmmaking. He made the first ever movie trailer in the history of Iranian cinema for the movie A Girl From Shira in 1954. Subsequent films, such as The Strike and The Eagles, were box office hits of their times.

The 1956 film A Party in Hell directed by Khachikian was entered into the 8th Berlin International Film Festival.

Khachikian's brother Souren Khachikian was also heavily involved in the production of his films. Souren's grandson Ara H. Keshishian is working as a film editor in Hollywood. Samuel Khachikian's son Edwin Khachikian is also a director.

He died on October 22, 2001, at the age of seventy-eight in Tehran, Iran.

Filmography

1953: Return (Bazgasht)
1954: A Girl From Shiraz (Dokhtari az Shiraz)
1955: 
1955: Blood and Honor (Khoon va Sharaf)
1956: A Party in Hell (Shab-Neshini dar Jahannam)
1958: A Messenger From Heaven (Ghasede Behesht)
1958: 
1959: The Hill of Love (Tappeye Eshgh)
1961: One Step to Death (Yak Qadam ta Marg)
1961: The Midnight Terror (Faryad-e Nimeshab)
1962: Anxiety (Delhoreh)
1964: The Strike (Zarbat)
1965: Delirium (Sarsam)
1965: Never Without Love (Ba Eshgh Hargez)
1966: Insurgence (Esyan)
1966: Khodahafez Tehran (Farewell to Tehran)
1967: The Tiger of Mazandaran (Babr-e Mazandaran)
1968: White Hell (Jahannam-e Safid)
1968: I Cried Too (Man Ham Gerye Kardam)
1968: Hengameh 
1969: The Cry of the Storm (Narya Tufan)
1970: Yalda Night Story (Ghesseye Shab-e Yalda)
1971: The Glass Wall (Divar-e Shishayi)
1973: The Kiss on Blood Lips
1975: Death in the Rain (Marg dar Baran)
1976: Anxiety (Ezterab)
1978: The Shark of the South (Koose-ye Jonoob)
1979: Explosion (Enfejar) 
1984: Eagles (Oghab-ha) 
1985: Cheetah (Yoozpalang)
1990: The Herald (Chavush)
1992: A Man in the Mirror (Mard-i dar Ayena)
1994: Bluff
2001: Doubt (unfinished due to Khachikian's illness)

References

Further reading

External links

 
 

Iranian film directors
Iranian film editors
Iranian screenwriters
Persian-language film directors
Writers from Tabriz
Iranian people of Armenian descent
1923 births
2001 deaths
Armenian-language writers
20th-century screenwriters